Filip Zekavičić (born 20 October 1992) is a Serbian professional basketball player who last played for Borac Čačak of the Basketball League of Serbia.

References

External links 
 Eurobasket Profile
 RealGM Profile
 BalkanLeague Profile
 ABA League Profile
 BGBasket Profile

1992 births
Living people
Centers (basketball)
People from Prijepolje
Basketball League of Serbia players
KK Beovuk 72 players
KK Borac Čačak players
KK Dynamic players
KK Metalac Valjevo players
OKK Beograd players
OKK Sloboda Tuzla players
KK Smederevo players
Serbian men's basketball players
Serbian expatriate basketball people in North Macedonia
Serbian expatriate basketball people in Romania
Serbian expatriate basketball people in Russia
Serbian expatriate basketball people in Bosnia and Herzegovina
Serbian expatriate basketball people in Poland
Serbian expatriate basketball people in Slovenia